The  is a joint venture set up by the Japanese public broadcaster Japan Broadcasting Corp. (NHK) and several commercial television and radio networks under the National Association of Commercial Broadcasters in Japan (NAB) in 1984 to cover broadcasts of the Summer Olympic Games, Winter Olympic Games and the FIFA World Cup.

Participating media outlets

Television

Free-to-Air
NHK General TV (AK)
Fuji TV (CX)
Nippon TV (AX)
TBS (RX)
TV Asahi (EX)
TV Tokyo (TX)
UHF independent TV stations

Broadcast Satellite
NHK BS1
NHK BS Premium
BS Asahi
BS Fuji
BS TV Tokyo
BS Nittele
BS-TBS

Radio

AM
NHK Radio 1
NHK Radio 2
Nippon Broadcasting System (LF)
Nippon Cultural Broadcasting (QR)
TBS Radio (TBS)

FM
NHK FM Broadcast
InterFM 
J-Wave (FMJ)
Tokyo FM (TFM)

Shortwave
Radio Nikkei

Others
NOTTV (smartphones, 2012 Summer Olympics only)
WOWOW (FIFA World Cup only)

Coverages

Summer Olympic Games

Winter Olympic Games

FIFA World Cup

References

1992 establishments in Japan
1992 in Japanese television
Broadcasting in Japan
Joint ventures